Marcia Arriaga (born 18 October 1955) is a Mexican former freestyle swimmer. She competed at the 1968 Summer Olympics and the 1972 Summer Olympics.

References

External links
 

1955 births
Living people
Mexican female freestyle swimmers
Olympic swimmers of Mexico
Swimmers at the 1968 Summer Olympics
Swimmers at the 1972 Summer Olympics
Pan American Games medalists in swimming
Pan American Games bronze medalists for Mexico
Swimmers at the 1971 Pan American Games
Sportspeople from Acapulco
Central American and Caribbean Games gold medalists for Mexico
Central American and Caribbean Games medalists in swimming
Competitors at the 1970 Central American and Caribbean Games
Medalists at the 1971 Pan American Games
20th-century Mexican women
21st-century Mexican women